Sex, Death & the Infinite Void is the second studio album by English rock band Creeper released on 31 July 2020 by Roadrunner Records. The album was produced by Wax Ltd's Xandy Barry and was inspired by their experiences touring the United States with Waterparks.

Unlike the band's previous album which was described as "horror punk," this album takes influence from Roy Orbison, David Bowie, Type O Negative as well as brit-pop and 70's British rock and roll. Similar to their debut, the album is categorised as a concept album, this time about the story of an angel who falls from grace as he experiences love for the first time. The story takes place in a small Californian town inspired by Dunsmuir, California as well as the TV show Twin Peaks. Each of the singles' music videos are built around the album's narrative.

It's also the final release to feature recordings from drummer Dan Bratton, who parted ways with the band in September 2020 for undisclosed reasons.

Background and recording
In November 2018, the band played the last show of the Eternity, in Your Arms album cycle at the KOKO in Camden Town, London. Before the final song, Misery, frontman Will Gould stated ""not only is it the last show of this album, but it’s the last show that we’ll ever do,"" an almost word-for-word callback to David Bowie’s speech at Hammersmith Apollo on July 3, 1973, where he killed off the character of ‘Ziggy Stardust’ on stage. Gould stated "the idea was to end it in the same way it began, and the campaign began with a disappearing act."

Following this, the band were set to head over to LA to write and record the record together. However, guitarist and co-songwriter Ian Miles' mental health took a downward turn leading to him being hospitalised causing Gould and Miles to have to write songs together over FaceTime. Due to the dark place both Gould and Miles found themselves in, they considered breaking up the band. Gould described the year between the KOKO gig and the band's return as the worst year of his life due to his relationship with his fiancée falling apart, his mother's partner passing away, Miles' mental health struggles and feeling lonely and isolated in LA. However, Gould found an escape through the glamour of Los Angeles, drinking and spending time in the studio. Tracks that were left over from the writing/recording process were later released as the 'American Noir' EP.

Promotion and release
A year to the day after the band's last show, they performed at the London venue "Club 229" under the name "Fugitives of Heaven." On November 3, they released the first single from the album "Born Cold" a song written about the character Roe inspired by the "selfish, narcissistic" David Bowie character The Thin White Duke. The band also announced a supporting slot on Babymetal's 2020 Metal Galaxy world tour.

The following single "Annabelle" was released on January 20, inspired by a run in with American church the Westboro Baptist Church on the 2017 Warped Tour.

The album was officially announced on January 10 for a May 22 release date alongside a UK tour, both of which would be delayed due to the 2020 COVID-19 pandemic.

Released in the weeks leading up to the album, the podcast Creeper: The Story Of... Sex, Death & Infinite Void chronicles this disturbing period for the band. The podcast is narrated by William Gould, Ian Miles and a cast of band members, producer Xandy Barry and the band's manager.

Composition

Musical style
Stylistically, Sex, Death & the Infinite Void is a departure from the band's previous horror punk sound, taking heavy influence from British rock bands, specifically David Bowie's "Aladdin Sane" album, The Beatles, The Cure, T. Rex and Britpop bands such as Suede, Pulp and Oasis. Gould also cited the "pop sensibilities" of Bruce Springsteen and Cyndi Lauper as well as the "apocalyptic romanticism" of Roy Orbison's "Mystery Girl" album as influences. Tracks on the album have described as gothic rock, britpop, pop punk, rock n roll, glam rock, rockabilly and country.

Lyrical content
The lyrics of Sex, Death & the Infinite Void are "about being grown up. It’s about sex, death and the infinite void. It’s about alienation – it’s about feeling like you’re living in someone else’s world and it’s about learning what it is to be human." Gould stated "there are songs about battles with alcoholism and crazy nights out," "but there’s also a real heart to it and a real sadness to the whole thing." Inspired by Dunsmuir, California, a town in which the band stopped in during their US tour with Waterparks, the album's narrative follows an angel who comes a small town intending to warn people of a coming apocalypse, however, soon finds himself turning to sin as he falls in love with a woman he meets, and subsequently invokes the wrath of her fiancé. Other characters in the story include seven families, each of whom represent one of the seven deadly sins.

Critical reception

Sex, Death & the Infinite Void received widespread acclaim from music critics. Aggregating website Metacritic reports a normalised rating of 91 based on eight critical reviews, indicating "universal acclaim" for the release. Many critics praised the album's shift in tone described by DIY as being "tinged with a more moody Americana feel, and doused with faded Hollywood seediness." The band's experimentation with different genres and not restricting themselves to one sound was also praised. "Genre is Dead! Magazine" stated that Gould's vocals had improved over its predecessor, "opting to croon or sing baritone rather than scream".

Louder stated that every song on the album sounds completely distinct and described it as an "exercise in escapism and experimentation" seeing the band "liberated from the constraints of genre, showcasing their immense, diverse talent and creating a new world that holds our attention at a time when that's a difficult thing to pull off." The review for AllMusic claimed it "a sh*t-ton of fun -- a master class in smudged-eyeliner camp directed by a clutch of vampires masquerading as musical theater majors."

Riot Mag compared the album to Danger Days: The True Lives of the Fabulous Killjoys by My Chemical Romance in the way it perfectly captures the same adventure while carrying the "morose weight of actually having to deal with your consequences." Rather than the comparisons to Alkaline Trio and AFI seen on their last album, critics drew comparisons to Nick Cave, Roy Orbison, Roxy Music, David Bowie, Suede, Pulp (band), Meat Loaf, Blur, Supergrass, Queen and Prince

Track listing
Songwriting credits per booklet.

Personnel
Adapted from CD liner notes.

Creeper
Will Gould – lead vocals
Ian Miles – guitar
Oliver Burdett – guitar
Sean Scott – bass
Hannah Greenwood – keyboards, backing vocals
Dan Bratton – drums
Production personnel
Xandy Barry – production, mixing, engineering, orchestral arrangements & programming
Timothy Williams - orchestral arrangements & programming
Wally Gagel - mixing
Spike Stent - mixing
Redah Haddioui - mix assist, engineering
Matt Wolach - mix assist
Richard Woodcroft - engineering
Andrew Lappin - engineering
Pete Lyman – mastering
Stuart Hawkes - mastering on track 4
Art design
Andy Pritchard - layout
Demon Dance - design of the 'Descending Angel'
Billy Howard Price - photos
Additional Personnel
Patricia Morrison- Voice  of "Annabelle"

Charts

References 

Creeper (band) albums
Albums postponed due to the COVID-19 pandemic
2020 albums